The Borsu surface is an erosion surface found as valley benches in the northern Scandinavian Mountains. The surface was first identified by Walter Wråk who published his findings in Ymer in 1908.

References

Landforms of Norway
Landforms of Sweden
Erosion landforms